The Wizard of Speed and Time is a 1988 low-budget feature film written, directed, and starring animator Mike Jittlov, as well as a 1979 16 mm short film, also by Jittlov.

1979 short film
In the original short film, a young man in a green wizard costume runs throughout America at super speed, much like the superhero The Flash.  Along the way, he gives a hitchhiking woman (Toni Handcock) a swift lift to another city and gives golden stars to other women who want a trip themselves.  He then slips on a banana peel and comically crashes into a film stage, which he then brings to life in magical ways.
 
Jittlov is a special effects technician, and he produced all of the special effects in the film himself, many through stop motion animation.

This short film originally was shown as a segment of an episode of The Wonderful World of Disney. The episode was called "Major Effects" and was aired to coincide with the release of Disney's The Black Hole in 1979.

The film segment then began to be shown at science fiction conventions around the country, gaining popularity, prompting Jittlov to eventually create a (semi-)fictionalized account, in the form of a feature film, of how this short film came to be.

1988 feature film
Years later, Jittlov was able to remake the short, as well as incorporate portions of some of his other short films (such as Time Tripper and Animato), into a feature-length 35 mm film. The feature version recounts the exploits of a special effects "wizard" (played by Jittlov) trying to fulfill his dream of making a full-length movie. The tricks of movie magic are exposed; but so are the tribulations of the independent moviemaker working around the heavily unionized Hollywood film industry.

Straeker: There are your film cans, but you can't move them.
Jittlov: Why? Are they stuck to the floor?
Straeker: No, to the system!

Many scenes in the movie turned out to be only too prophetic, according to Jittlov. In the film, a director, Lucky Straeker (Steve Brodie), and a producer, Harvey Bookman (Richard Kaye), bet over whether Jittlov can actually complete a major effects assignment, and Bookman does everything in his power to thwart Jittlov.

Richard Kaye produced the film and starred as one of the main characters, Harvey Bookman, also a producer.  Richard Kaye's daughter Lauri Kaye, at the age of 16, was the production secretary of The Wizard of Speed and Time and  performed in the film as a voice-over artist and a hand model.

The feature film is also filled with subliminal messages, many hidden in single frames during the "Wizard Run" sequence (which was remade and expanded from the original short film), or hidden in electrical sparks generated by various happenings in the film.

The feature film was filmed in 1983 to 1986, released to theaters in 1989 (though it was never widely distributed), and was later released on VHS and laserdisc. Although there is no official DVD release yet, Jittlov's fans have (with Jittlov's knowledge and at least tacit approval) created a DVD image file, and made it available for free on peer-to-peer networks until such time as an official release is realized.

Cameos in the film include science fiction and film industry personalities (Forrest J. Ackerman, Angelique Pettyjohn, Ward Kimball, Will Ryan, and a pre-Miami Vice Philip Michael Thomas) as well as composer John Massari. The only "lookalike" used in the film was a Woody Allen impersonator who appears in two scenes when Mike is being chased by the Keystone Cops through the studio lot.
The two "real" police characters played by Philip Michael Thomas and Lynda Aldon are named Mickey (Polanko) and Minnie (Smith), respectively, in the film and the police dog's name is Pluto.
When asked by television producers if he had ever played a police officer, Philip Michael Thomas replied "Yes, I was a cop in a feature film." This led to his being cast in Miami Vice.
Two characters are given names related to cigarettes: Lucky Straeker, Bookman's director and Dora Belair, an assistant to a competing show's producer. According to Mike Jittlov, "Everyone in Hollywood gets burned."
Jittlov's mother and brother appear as themselves.
A special birthday song, "Merry Birthday to You", was composed to avoid potential licensing issues for the traditional "Happy Birthday to You".
Some parts of "The Wizard's Run" have been changed, mostly reflecting Paige Moore's starring role.
In the stunt driving shots from the car-chase scene, Pluto, the police dog in the back seat, was played by Jittlov wearing a coat over his head.
As shown in the film, Mike Jittlov avoids shaking hands.
Over 1000 subliminals are embedded throughout the film.
The poster for the film was done by artist Kelly Freas, who put a number of subliminal images into the painting; Freas also printed the faux film titles seen on the producers' bulletin board.
The fans in the climactic theater scene provided their own costumes.
The opening credits read "Directed By The Man In The Green Jacket". Mike Jittlov wears a green jacket throughout the film.
The scenes in which Mike speaks to the Union representatives were all shot at the same desk in the same room, with veteran voice-over artist Will Ryan playing all the representatives. The film union seal shows a vulture with a twisted strip of film in its talons.
Cinematographer Russell Carpenter later worked on such films as The Lawnmower Man, The Indian in the Cupboard, Titanic, Charlie's Angels (and the sequel Charlie's Angels: Full Throttle), Shallow Hal and Monster-in-Law.
Composer John Massari later worked on such films as Killer Klowns from Outer Space, Skeletons, Retro Puppet Master, and such television shows as POV Murder and Prison Break: Proof of Innocence.
The film's musical score that plays during "the Wizard's Run" was recently used in a trailer for the Toy Story 3 videogame.
A Spanish language dubbed version was released onto VHS under the title El Mago de la Velocidad y el Tiempo.

Legacy
In the November 2019 Marvel comic book Loki, issue 5, the title character states that The Wizard of Speed and Time is his favorite film.

References

External links
official website

, uploaded with the permission of Jittlov

1979 films
1988 films
American independent films
Self-reflexive films
Features based on short films
1970s stop-motion animated films
1980s stop-motion animated films
Pixilation films
Films directed by Mike Jittlov
Films about filmmaking
1980s English-language films
1970s English-language films
1970s American films
1980s American films